Beck's triad is a collection of three medical signs associated with acute cardiac tamponade, a medical emergency when excessive fluid accumulates in the pericardial sac around the heart and impairs its ability to pump blood. The signs are low arterial blood pressure, distended neck veins, and distant, muffled heart sounds.

Narrowed pulse pressure might also be observed. The concept was developed in 1935 by Claude Beck, a resident and later Professor of Cardiovascular Surgery at Case Western Reserve University.

Components
The components are:
 Hypotension with a narrowed pulse pressure
 Jugular venous distention (JVD)
 Muffled heart sounds

Physiology
The fall in arterial blood pressure results from pericardial fluid accumulation inside the pericardial sac, which decreases the maximum size of the ventricles. This limits diastolic expansion (filling) which results in a lower EDV (End Diastolic Volume) which reduces stroke volume, a major determinant of systolic blood pressure. This is in accordance with the Frank-Starling law of the heart, which explains that as the ventricles fill with larger volumes of blood, they stretch further, and their contractile force increases, thus causing a related increase in systolic blood pressure.

The rising central venous pressure is evidenced by distended jugular veins while in a non-supine position.  It is caused by reduced diastolic filling of the right ventricle, due to pressure from the adjacent expanding pericardial sac.  This results in a backup of fluid into the veins draining into the heart, most notably, the jugular veins. In severe hypovolemia, the neck veins may not be distended.

The suppressed heart sounds occur due to the muffling effects of the fluid surrounding the heart.

Clinical use
Although the full triad is present only in a minority of cases of acute cardiac tamponade, presence of the triad is considered pathognomonic for the condition.

References

Symptoms and signs: Cardiac
Medical emergencies
Medical triads
3 (number)